The range of area codes 500-599 is currently reserved for the states of Mexico and Hidalgo.

(For other areas, see Area codes in Mexico by code).

5